Dasycerinae is a subfamily of rove beetles. Dasycerinae currently only contains 1 extant genus and 3 extinct genera.

Genera 
There are currently 4 described genera in Dasycerinae:

 †Cedasyrus 
 Dasycerus 
 †Protodasycerus 
 †Vetudasycerus 

(† = extinct)

Anatomy 
They have antennae with 11 segments and trisegmented antennal clubs. The tarsi have three segments, and the elytra cover or nearly cover the entire abdomen.

Ecology
These beetles inhabit moist broadleaf forest litter.
Eastern species are wingless with small eyes; dissected females have only been found with a single egg. They are known to occur on fruiting fungi, but may not specifically feed on them.

References

Further reading
Herman, L.H. 2001: Catalog of the Staphylinidae (Insecta, Coleoptera): 1758 to the end of the second millennium. I. Introduction, history, biographical sketches, and omaliine group. Bulletin of the American Museum of Natural History, (265): 1–650. 
 Löbl, I., and F. G. Calame. 1996. Taxonomy and phylogeny of the Dasycerinae (Coleoptera: Staphylinidae). Journal of Natural History 30: 247–291.
Wheeler, Q. D., and J. V. McHugh. 1994. A new southern Appalachian species, Dasycerus bicolor (Coleoptera: Staphylinidae: Dasycerinae), from declining endemic fir forests. The Coleopterists Bulletin 48: 265–271.

External links

Dasycerinae at Bugguide.net

Staphylinidae